Robert Alexander Croft (March 17, 1946 – March 23, 2014) was a Canadian professional basketball player. He played as a centre in the American Basketball Association (ABA) for the Texas Chaparrals and the Kentucky Colonels during the 1970–71 season. He attended Hill Park Secondary School in Hamilton, Ontario and later went on to study at the University of Tennessee before being drafted as the fourth pick in the eighth round by the Boston Celtics in the 1970 NBA draft. He died at a hospice in Burlington, Ontario in 2014, aged 68.

References

External links

1946 births
2014 deaths
American men's basketball players
Boston Celtics draft picks
Canadian expatriate basketball people in the United States
Canadian men's basketball players
Centers (basketball)
Kentucky Colonels players
Tennessee Volunteers basketball players
Texas Chaparrals players